HD 220074 is a star located in the northern constellation of Cassiopeia, near the western border with Cepheus. It has a reddish hue and is dimly visible to the naked eye, having an apparent visual magnitude of +6.39. The star is located at a distance of approximately 1,070 light years from the Sun based on parallax, but is drifting closer with a radial velocity of −37 km/s.

This star was assigned a stellar classification of K1V in the Bright Star Catalogue but is now known to be a red giant with a class of M2III, based on its radius and surface gravity. With the supply of hydrogen at its core exhausted, the star has expanded and cooled off the main sequence. It is around 4.5 billion years old with an estimated mass equal to ~1.2 times the mass of the Sun but 60 times the Sun's radius. The star is radiating 783 times the luminosity of the Sun from its enlarged photosphere at an effective temperature of 3,935 K.

Planetary system
From September 2008 to June 2012, the team B.-C. Lee, I. Han, and M.-G. Park observed HD 220074 with "the high-resolution spectroscopy of the fiber-fed Bohyunsan Observatory Echelle Spectrograph (BOES) at Bohyunsan Optical Astronomy Observatory (BOAO)".

In 2012, a long-period, wide-orbiting eccentric planet was deduced by radial velocity changes. This finding was published in November, gaining the designation HD 220074 b. Along with HD 208527 b this is one of the first two candidate planets found orbiting red giants.

References

M-type giants
Planetary systems with one confirmed planet
Cassiopeia (constellation)
Durchmusterung objects
220074
115218
8881